Makoto Lavemai (ラベマイまこと, born Makoto Ebuchi, July 2, 1997) is a Japanese women's rugby union player. She played for Yokogawa Musashino Artemi Stars .

Biography 
Lavemai graduated from Fukuoka High School in 2016, and entered Aoyama Gakuin University. She graduated from Aoyama Gakuin University in 2020, then joined Toppan Printing. Her husband is also a rugby player, Sione Lavemai.

Rugby career 
Lavemai competed for Japan at the 2017 Women's Rugby World Cup in Ireland. In 2021, She played in Japan's autumn test match against Ireland in November. They were narrowly defeated 15–12.

Lavemai joined the Brumbies for the 2022 Super W season, along with Sakura Fifteens teammate, Mana Furuta. She played against Ireland again in August 2022. Despite a four-point margin at half-time; Ireland managed to make a comeback to outscore Japan by 50 points.

In September 2022, Lavemai started in Japan's historic match against the Black Ferns ahead of the World Cup. Japan were trounced 95–12 with the Black Ferns scoring 15 tries. She also competed at the delayed 2021 Rugby World Cup in New Zealand. She featured in the matches against Canada and Italy in the pool stage.

References

External links 
 Makoto Lavemai at Japan Rugby

1997 births
Japanese rugby union players
Japanese female international rugby union players
Living people